Vaginal lubrication is a naturally produced fluid that lubricates a 
vagina. Vaginal lubrication is always present, but production increases significantly near ovulation and during sexual arousal in anticipation of sexual intercourse. Vaginal dryness is the condition in which this lubrication is insufficient, and sometimes artificial lubricants are used to augment it. Without sufficient lubrication, sexual intercourse can be painful. The vaginal lining has no glands, and therefore the vagina must rely on other methods of lubrication. Plasma from vaginal walls due to vascular engorgement is considered to be the chief lubrication source, and the Bartholin's glands, located slightly below and to the left and right of the introitus (vaginal opening), also secrete mucus to augment vaginal-wall secretions. Near ovulation, cervical mucus provides additional lubrication.

Vaginal discharge

Composition

Vaginal fluid is slightly acidic and can become more acidic with certain sexually transmitted diseases. The normal pH of vaginal fluid is between 3.8 and 4.5, contrasting with male semen which is typically between 7.2 and 7.8 (neutral pH is 7.0).

During arousal, vaginal lubrication, also sometimes called "arousal fluid", is produced. This is clear, thin, and slippery. It typically only lasts up to an hour.

Production
The human vagina is serviced by nerves that respond to vasoactive intestinal polypeptide (VIP). As a result, VIP induces an increase in vaginal blood flow accompanied by an increase in vaginal lubrication. The findings suggest that VIP may participate in the control of the local physiological changes observed during sexual arousal: genital vasodilation and increase in vaginal lubrication.

Vaginal dryness
Insufficient lubrication or vaginal dryness can cause dyspareunia, which is a type of sexual pain disorder. While vaginal dryness is considered an indicator for sexual arousal disorder, vaginal dryness may also result from insufficient excitement and stimulation or from hormonal changes caused by menopause (potentially causing atrophic vaginitis), pregnancy, or breast-feeding. Irritation from contraceptive creams and foams can also cause dryness, as can fear and anxiety about sexual intimacy. Vaginal dryness can also be a symptom of Sjögren syndrome (SS), a chronic autoimmune disorder in which the body destroys moisture-producing glands.

Certain medications, including some over-the-counter antihistamines, as well as life events such as pregnancy, lactation, menopause, aging or diseases such as diabetes, will inhibit lubrication.  Medicines with anticholinergic or sympathomimetic effects will dry out the mucosal or "wet" tissues of the vagina.  Such medicines include many common drugs for allergenic, cardiovascular, psychiatric, and other medical conditions. Oral contraceptives may also increase or decrease vaginal lubrication.

In seemingly rare cases, selective serotonin reuptake inhibitors (SSRIs) have been reported to cause a long-lasting iatrogenic disorder known as post-SSRI sexual dysfunction (PSSD), the symptoms of which include reduced vaginal lubrication in females.

Older women produce less vaginal lubrication and reduced estrogen levels may be associated with increased vaginal dryness.

Artificial lubricants

When a woman is experiencing vaginal dryness before sexual activity, sexual intercourse may be uncomfortable or painful for her.  A personal lubricant can be applied to the vaginal opening, the penis (or other penetrating object such as fingers or a dildo), or both, to augment the naturally produced lubrication and prevent or reduce the discomfort or pain. More rarely, a vaginal suppository may be inserted prior to intercourse.

Oil-based lubricants can weaken latex and reduce the effectiveness of condoms, latex gloves, or dental dams as either forms of birth control or for protection from sexually transmitted diseases, so water- or silicone-based lubricants are often used instead. The use of an artificial lubricant can make sexual intercourse less painful for a woman, but does not address the underlying cause of the vaginal dryness itself.

Dry sex
Some people practice dry sex, which involves the removal of vaginal lubrication in some way. The rationale for the practice seems to be for cleansing purposes and to enhance the sexual pleasure of the penetrating partner.  However, besides making sexual intercourse painful for the female, the practice is believed to increase the risk of transmitting sexually transmitted diseases for both partners, such as HIV, whose risk of transmission is increased by lacerations in the vaginal tissue resulting from the lack of lubrication.

See also

References

External links

 Mayo Clinic - Vaginal dryness

Sexual arousal
Gynaecology
Body fluids
Vagina